W. A. Porter Collegiate Institute, officially known as the Scarborough Academy of Technological, Environmental and Computer Studies @ W. A. Porter Collegiate Institute (SATEC, SATEC @ W. A. Porter C.I., WAPCI, W. A. Porter or Porter) is a secondary school in Toronto, Ontario, Canada. It is located in the Clairlea neighbourhood of the former suburb of Scarborough. The school provides grades 9-12 as part of the Toronto District School Board, formerly part of the Scarborough Board of Education.

Founded in 1958, the school program combines academics with in-depth applications of technology, computer and environmental studies. SATEC is an enriched science, technology, engineering and mathematics focused school. It is consistently ranked #1 in Toronto for Technological Studies, and within the top three for Math and Science. Porter's motto is Vincit qui se Vincit which means "He conquers who conquers himself".

History
Located on 14.9 acres of land, W. A. Porter Collegiate Institute had its cornerstone laid and constructed in 1957 and opened for classes on September 9, 1958 to serve the south-west area of Scarborough as the city's fifth collegiate. The building was designed by the Toronto-based architectural firm Carter, Coleman and Rankin Associates.

The school's namesake, William Arnot Porter (1893-1956) began teaching in 1922 at Scarborough High School as a science teacher, specializing in the science of agriculture. He became the school's principal in 1954, and continued his lifelong work until his death in 1956. The school's founding principal was J. Ross Stevenson who served a year at Porter until he was transferred to the new David and Mary Thomson Collegiate Institute in 1959.

By 1961, the swimming pool was added. Additions were made in subsequent years.

With enrollment numbers dwindling, the SBE considered closing either Porter or Midland Avenue Collegiate Institute. However, instead, it was decided that at the start of the 1997–98 school year, W. A. Porter Collegiate was designated as the Scarborough Academy of Technological, Environmental and Computer Studies by the SBE, although the original name continues to exist. As of the 2000–01 academic year, Porter's attendance area was expanded after Midland closed that June. Since then, Porter's enrollment has rapidly increased.

The school celebrated its 50th anniversary in 2008, coinciding with the PEO Engineering Education Conference of the same year.

In 2010, Porter C.I. became a certified, platinum Eco-School of the TDSB.

Porter has a range of specialized programs like MST (Math and Science Technology), Cisco, High Skills Major, and many more.

It celebrated its 60th anniversary in 2018.

Porter's feeder schools are Clairlea Public School, Danforth Gardens Public School, General Brock Public School and Regent Heights Public School

Overview
Admissions to SATEC @ Porter Collegiate are competitive and based on three factors: the entrance test, which is held each December, the student's Ontario grade 7 final report card, and the extra-curricular and leadership supplementary application. Along with this, applicants must bring a $10 fee and photo identification to the test. Students are ranked based on all three factors, and those at the top of the ranking are admitted first, whereas students who are not accepted may be placed on a waiting list if deemed necessary by school administration. The school allows re-applying for admissions up until grade 9.

SATEC/Porter is regarded as a magnet school by the school board because of its strong technology program and its policies. It is a CISCO regional academy with certification in CISCO Networking and A+ Computer Service Technician Certification for the senior program. It has been named “Best For Technology” every year since 2006 among the secondary schools of Toronto. Along with R. H. King Academy, it is one of the few schools to have uniform policies and to accept students out of area.

The school offers two Specialist High Skills Major (SHSM) programs: ICT (Information and Communication Technology) and the Environment. In each program, students are required to complete a set number of courses, including a two-credit co-op course, along with obtaining industry standard certification. The first graduates from SATEC/Porter with the Specialist High Skills Major accreditation were the Class of 2011.

Facility
W. A. Porter currently sits on 14.9 acres in a two-storey building. Unlike Winston Churchill Collegiate Institute and West Hill Collegiate Institute which were both designed by Harold Carter, the academic areas and gymnatorium layout are the shape of a backward letter L. Other features include a 500-seat auditorium, library resource centre, three gymnasiums, a weight room, cafeteria, technical-vocational shops and a six-lane pool located at the eastern corner of the school. There are 15 fire exits.

During the summer months, the YMCA leases out the school and operates children's camps with the school's facilities.

In January 2016, the TDSB released a list of schools which needed major repairs ranked by the province in "critical" condition. SATEC/Porter, built in 1956, was ranked 26th of 136 in the repair backlog list at 96.09%.

Athletics
In November 2012, the school hosted the reenactment of the 38th Grey Cup Mud Bowl that occurred on November 25, 1950 as part of a string of CFL festivities to commemorate the 100th Grey Cup. With generous support of corporate donors in Rona and the Toronto Argonauts, SATEC revamped its track field into a regulation-sized football stadium.

SATEC hosted its first-ever Friday night game on October 11, 2013 against David and Mary Thomson Collegiate Institute. Soon after, a selected group of players appeared on CP24 Breakfast with Nalini Sharma as Argos head coach Jim Barker demonstrated the fundamental runs and tackles of the sport.

The coach of the Porter Blue Eagles is Kyle Franchetto.

Clubs
SATEC has many student clubs for interests such as athletics, human rights, DECA and Model United Nations. In 2012, Free the Children's Craig Kielburger donated $5000 to SATEC's VON club as a prize for their charitable initiatives.

The Student Administrative Council (SAC) is the student body in charge of all affairs between students and teachers at SATEC. It hosts new student arrival initiatives with Prefects and PAC, an annual Halloween event, and holiday festivities which include the semi-formal. SAC is also responsible for the Valentine's Day event working with the "Stop the Stigma" program to promote good mental health, the Prom, and an annual barbecue in the late spring term organized by the SAC, PAC and other groups.

See also
List of high schools in Ontario

References

External links
SATEC @ W. A. Porter Collegiate Institute
TDSB Profile

High schools in Toronto
Educational institutions established in 1958
Schools in the TDSB
1958 establishments in Ontario
Education in Scarborough, Toronto
Toronto Lands Corporation